Orion is the second feature film by writer/director Asiel Norton. It was released in Canada in 2015, in the UK in 2016, and in the USA in 2017. It stars David Arquette and Lily Cole.

Plot
The film is set a century after the collapse of civilization in a wasteland known as The Rust. The last human survivors exist in squalor. Arquette plays The Hunter, a man who wanders into an area controlled by The Magician, a man who is more than human.

Cast
David Arquette
Lily Cole
Goran Kostić
Terri Partyka
Jimmy Doom
Lisette Miller
Sophia Findley

References

External links
 
 

2015 films
2010s English-language films